The 2022–23 Campionato Sammarinese di Calcio is the 38th season of league competition in San Marino, in which the country's top 15 amateur football teams competed. The season began on 2 September 2022 and will end in May 2022.

Participating teams

First phase
The regular season was contested by fifteen teams who played each other twice. Eight teams advanced to the second phase. The top four teams at the end of the first phase advanced to the second phase and the next eight teams played for the other four spots in the second phase.

League table

Results

Top scorers

References

External links
 

Campionato Sammarinese di Calcio
San Marino
Campionato Sammarinese di Calcio